Suleiman Abdullahi (born 10 December 1996) is a Nigerian professional footballer who plays as a striker for Allsvenskan club IFK Göteborg.

Career
Abdullahi was born in Kaduna, Nigeria. He signed a contract for Viking FK in 2015. He made his debut for Viking on 6 April 2015 against Mjøndalen, they lost the game 1–0.

In June 2016, Abdullahi signed a four-year contract with 2. Bundesliga side Eintracht Braunschweig. In spring 2018 he injured his ankle which kept him out of action until the end of 2017–18 season. In two seasons with Braunschweig he made 41 league appearances scoring 8 goals and making 6 assists.

In August 2018, following Braunschweig's relegation, Abdullahi joined 1. FC Union Berlin on loan for the season. Union Berlin secured an option to sign him permanently until 2022. It was reported he would be able to return to training four to six weeks later as a result of his ankle injury.

On 1 June 2019, 1. FC Union Berlin signed Abdullahi on a permanent transfer following his loan spell at the club.

In August 2020, Abdullahi returned to Eintracht Braunschweig, joining on loan for the 2020–21 season.

On 28 June 2022, Abdullahi signed a contract until the end of 2025 with Swedish club IFK Göteborg.

Career statistics

Club

References

1996 births
Living people
Sportspeople from Kaduna
Nigerian footballers
Association football forwards
El-Kanemi Warriors F.C. players
Viking FK players
Eintracht Braunschweig players
1. FC Union Berlin players
IFK Göteborg players
Nigeria Professional Football League players
Eliteserien players
Bundesliga players
2. Bundesliga players
Allsvenskan players
Nigerian expatriate footballers
Expatriate footballers in Norway
Expatriate footballers in Germany
Expatriate footballers in Sweden
Nigerian expatriate sportspeople in Norway
Nigerian expatriate sportspeople in Germany
Nigerian expatriate sportspeople in Sweden